is a multi-purpose concrete gravity dam in Kawasaki, Miyagi Prefecture, Japan, completed in 1970.

The number of residents living in the target area was 181 households and 1,103 people, which was more than that of Okura Dam. As a result, residents strongly opposed the construction of the dam, and compensation negotiations with the Ministry of Construction were forced to take a long time. After repeated negotiations, it took three years since the implementation plan survey was started, the general compensation standard was concluded, and a signing was made with the representatives of the residents. Residents left their hometown after this, but of the 181 households, 25% relocated to their hometown of Kawasaki, 52% to Sendai, and 23% to other cities, towns and villages outside the prefecture or within the prefecture.

See also

 Natori River

References 

Dams in Miyagi Prefecture
Dams completed in 1970
Kawasaki, Miyagi
Hydroelectric power stations in Japan